Elrick is both a surname and a given name. Notable people with the name include:

Surname
Adrian Elrick (born 1949), New Zealand international soccer player
George Elrick (1903–1999), British musician, impresario and radio presenter
M.L. Elrick (born 1968), American journalist
Mark Elrick (born 1967), New Zealand soccer player
Nadene Elrick, New Zealand international soccer player
Rory Elrick, (born 1995), Scottish actor

Given name
Elrick Irastorza, (born 1950), French general